The 2013–14 Cal State Northridge Matadors women's basketball team represents California State University, Northridge during the 2013–14 NCAA Division I women's basketball season. The Matadors, led by fourth year head coach Jason Flowers, play their home games at the Matadome as members of the Big West Conference.

Roster

Schedule and results

|-
!colspan=9 style="background:#231F20; color:#CD1041;"| Exhibition

|-
!colspan=9 style="background:#231F20; color:#CD1041;"| Regular season

|-
!colspan=9 style="background:#231F20; color:#CD1041;"| Big West tournament

|-
!colspan=9 style="background:#231F20; color:#CD1041;"| NCAA tournament

References

Cal State Northridge Matadors women's basketball seasons
Cal State Northridge
Cal State